Friedrich Ernst Peter Hirzebruch ForMemRS (17 October 1927 – 27 May 2012) was a German mathematician, working in the fields of topology, complex manifolds and algebraic geometry, and a leading figure in his generation. He has been described as "the most important mathematician in Germany of the postwar period."

Education
Hirzebruch was born in Hamm, Westphalia in 1927. 
His father of the same name was a maths teacher.
Hirzebruch studied at the University of Münster from 1945–1950, with one year at ETH Zürich.

Career
Hirzebruch then held a position at Erlangen, followed by the years 1952–54 at the Institute for Advanced Study in Princeton, New Jersey. After one year at Princeton University 1955–56, he was made a professor at the University of Bonn, where he remained, becoming director of the Max-Planck-Institut für Mathematik in 1981.
More than 300 people gathered in celebration of his 80th birthday in Bonn in 2007.

The Hirzebruch–Riemann–Roch theorem (1954) for complex manifolds was a major advance and quickly became part of the mainstream developments around the classical Riemann–Roch theorem; 
it was also a precursor of the Atiyah–Singer index theorem and Grothendieck's powerful generalisation. 
Hirzebruch's book Neue topologische Methoden in der algebraischen Geometrie (1956) was a basic text for the 'new methods' of sheaf theory, in complex algebraic geometry. 
He went on to write the foundational papers on topological K-theory with Michael Atiyah, and collaborated with Armand Borel on the theory of characteristic classes.  In his later work he provided a detailed theory of Hilbert modular surfaces, with Don Zagier. He even found connections between the Dedekind sum in number theory and differential topology, one of the many discoveries found between these different fields. His work influenced a generation of prominent mathematicians like Kunihiko Kodaira, John Milnor, Borel, Atiyah, Raoul Bott and Jean-Pierre Serre.

In March 1945, Hirzebruch became a soldier, and in April, in the last weeks of Hitler's rule, he was taken prisoner by the British forces then invading Germany from the west.  When a British soldier found that he was studying mathematics, he drove him home and released him, and told him to continue studying.

Hirzebruch is famous for organizing the Mathematische Arbeitstagung ("working meetings" in German) in Bonn University, beginning from 1957, and the first speakers include Atiyah, Jacques Tits, Alexander Grothendieck, Hans Grauert, Nicolaas Kuiper, and Hirzebruch himself. It allowed international cooperation among the mathematical world for the last 60 years and was a major source of developments in topology, geometry, group theory, number theory as well as mathematical physics in a few decades' time. He also established the Max Planck Institute for Mathematics at Bonn in 1980. The institute became the place for the Arbeitstagung and Hirzebruch was its director until 1995. The second Arbeitstagung began in 1993 and continues to this day.

From 1970 to 1971 he was the Donegall Lecturer in Mathematics at Trinity College Dublin.

According to the Mathematics Genealogy Project, Hirzebruch has supervised the doctoral studies of 52 mathematicians. Some of them include Egbert Brieskorn, Matthias Kreck, Don Zagier, Detlef Gromoll, Klaus Jänich, Lothar Göttsche, Dietmar Arlt, Winfried Scharlau, Walter Neumann, Wolfgang Meyer, Kang Zuo, Hans Scheerer, Erich Ossa, Klaus Lamotke, Eduardo Mendoza, Dimitrios Dais and Friedhelm Waldhausen.

Hirzebruch died at the age of 84 on 27 May 2012.

Honours and awards
Amongst many other honours, Hirzebruch was awarded the Wolf Prize in Mathematics in 1988 and a Lobachevsky Medal in 1989.

The government of Japan awarded him the Order of the Sacred Treasure in 1996 and the Seki-Takakazu prize of the Mathematical Society of Japan (MSJ) in 1997.

Hirzebruch won an Einstein Medal of the Albert Einstein society in Bern in 1999, and received the Cantor medal in 2004.

Hirzebruch was a foreign member of numerous academies and societies, including the United States National Academy of Sciences, the Russian Academy of Sciences, the Royal Society and the French Academy of Sciences. 
In 1980–81 he delivered the first Sackler Distinguished Lecture in Israel. He was also a member of academies of Russia, Poland, Ukraine, Israel, Finland, Hungary, Netherlands, Göttingen, Austria, Ireland as well as the Academia Europaea and the European Academy of Arts and Sciences.

Hirzebruch was the president of the German Mathematical Society in 1962 and 1990, first after the foundation of a separate Eastern German mathematical due to the German division, and then again after the collapse of the wall which led to the unification of the East and West German Mathematical societies. He was also the first President of the European Mathematical Society from 1990 to 1994. In this way, he rebuilt the mathematical life in both Germany and Europe after the war.

References

External links

1927 births
2012 deaths
Albert Einstein Medal recipients
Algebraic geometers
Foreign Members of the Royal Society
Foreign Members of the USSR Academy of Sciences
Foreign Members of the Russian Academy of Sciences
Knights Commander of the Order of Merit of the Federal Republic of Germany
Members of the French Academy of Sciences
Institute for Advanced Study visiting scholars
Donegall Lecturers of Mathematics at Trinity College Dublin
Foreign associates of the National Academy of Sciences
People from Hamm
People from the Province of Westphalia
Recipients of the Order of the Sacred Treasure
Recipients of the Pour le Mérite (civil class)
University of Münster alumni
Academic staff of the University of Erlangen-Nuremberg
Academic staff of the University of Bonn
Wolf Prize in Mathematics laureates
German Army personnel of World War II
Members of the German Academy of Sciences at Berlin
20th-century German mathematicians
21st-century German mathematicians
German prisoners of war in World War II held by the United Kingdom
Presidents of the European Mathematical Society
Max Planck Institute directors